Utsav Rakshit is a Singaporean cricketer. He represented Singapore at the 2017 ICC World Cricket League Division Three tournament held in Entebbe, Uganda. In September 2019, he was named in Singapore's squad for the 2019–20 Singapore Tri-Nation Series tournament against Zimbabwe and Nepal.

References

External links
 

Year of birth missing (living people)
Living people
Singaporean cricketers
Place of birth missing (living people)